Paul Michael Sutcliffe is British mathematical physicist and mathematician, currently Professor of Theoretical Physics at the University of Durham. He specialises in the study of topological solitons.

He serves as the Project Director of the SPOCK (Scientific Properties of Complex Knots) research programme dedicated to the study of knotted structures.   Related subjects of research include skyrmions.

Sutcliffe was awarded the LMS Whitehead Prize in 2006 for contributions to the study of topological solitons and their dynamics.

Education
Sutcliffe graduated from Durham University in 1989.

Bibliography

Books
 Topological solitons (with Nick Manton), Cambridge University Press 2004

Selected academic works

 .
 .
 .

References

External links
 Home Page

Living people
Year of birth missing (living people)
Academics of Durham University
Alumni of University College, Durham
21st-century English mathematicians
Whitehead Prize winners